The term spin matrix refers to a number of matrices, which are related to spin (physics).

Quantum mechanics and pure mathematics

Pauli matrices, also called the "Pauli spin matrices".
Generalizations of Pauli matrices
Gamma matrices, which can be represented in terms of the Pauli matrices.
Higher-dimensional gamma matrices

See also

In pure mathematics and physics:

Wigner D-matrix, represent spins and rotations of quantum states and tensor operators.
Higher spin alternating sign matrix
Spin group
Spin (physics)#Higher spins